Ocampo is a town and seat of the municipality of Ocampo, in the central Mexican state of Michoacán. As of 2010, the town had a population of 3,799.

References

Populated places in Michoacán